Doom (stylized as DOOM) is a video game series and media franchise created by John Carmack, John Romero, Adrian Carmack, Kevin Cloud, and Tom Hall. The series usually focuses on the exploits of an unnamed space marine (often referred to as Doomguy or Doom Slayer) operating under the auspices of the Union Aerospace Corporation (UAC), who fights hordes of demons and the undead in order to save Earth from an apocalyptic invasion. 

The original Doom is considered one of the first pioneering first-person shooter games, introducing to IBM-compatible computers features such as 3D graphics, third-dimension spatiality, networked multiplayer gameplay, and support for player-created modifications with the Doom WAD format. Over 10 million copies of games in the Doom series have been sold; the series has spawned numerous sequels, novels, comic books, board games, and film adaptations.

Overview
The Doom video games consist of first-person shooters in which the player controls an unnamed space marine commonly referred to as Doomguy; in the 2016 series, the protagonist is called the "Doom Slayer" or just "Slayer". The player battles the forces of Hell, consisting of demons and the undead. The games are usually set within sprawling bases on Mars or its moons, while some parts take place in Hell itself. The classic series had only a limited focus on the story, much of which was present in the manuals rather than the games themselves. More recent titles, particularly the 2016 series, would feature a heavier focus on narrative.

The original game featured eight weapons, designed in such a way that no weapon became obsolete after the acquisition of another. With the player carrying all of these weapons at once, the strategy of "gun juggling"—rapidly switching between the weapons depending on circumstance—can be employed. Outside of combat mechanics, Doom levels often feature mazes, coloured key cards and hidden areas. Due to technical limitations, the player could not jump or look up and down in the classic series. These features were added in newer titles.

Development and history

Classic series (1992–1997) 

The development of the original Doom started in 1992, when John Carmack developed a new game engine, the Doom engine, while the rest of the id Software team finished the Wolfenstein 3D prequel, Spear of Destiny. The game launched in an episodic format in 1993, with the first episode available as shareware and two more episodes available by mail order. The first episode was largely designed by John Romero. The title proved extremely popular, with the full version of the game selling one million copies. The term "Doom clone" became the name for new genre now known as first-person shooters for several years.

Doom II: Hell on Earth was released in 1994 in a commercial format. Only minor changes were made at a technical level; the game featured new enemies, a new "Super Shotgun" weapon, and more complex levels. The game was followed by an expansion in 1995, titled Master Levels for Doom II, which added 20 additional levels. A fourth episode was added to the original game by the 1995 re-release.

From 1995 id Software were focused on the development of the new Quake series, which would be developed by the company throughout the late 1990s. Two additional games would be released over the following years, largely created by third-party developers under id's supervision. The first of these was Final Doom, which featured 64 levels based on the Doom II engine, organised into two episodes. TNT: Evilution was developed by the modding group TeamTNT and completed in November 1995, while the second episode The Plutonia Experiment was developed by TNT's Dario and Milo Casali and completed in January 1996.

Midway Games developed Doom 64 under id supervision for release in 1997. The title featured a new engine, with larger sprites and higher quality textures. The technical changes allowed for greater flexibility with level design, such as the ability to adjust the geometry of the map during play. Id did not allow the title to be called Doom 3, as the name was being reserved for a potential return to the franchise after the development of Quake.

Doom 3 and cancelled fourth game (2000–2013) 

The troubled development of Quake had resulted in major staffing changes at id by 2000, with a number of key figures from the development of Doom having departed. This included the original designer John Romero, who was fired in 1996. In the interim, the company had hired former Doom modder Tim Willits. By 2000 a new non-Doom game was being designed, but id staff had a "lack of enthusiasm" for the project, and strongly desired to remake the original Doom instead. John Carmack, among others, announced internally that they were working on a Doom game- and would continue to do so unless the company fired them. While Paul Steed was indeed fired, work on the game did continue.

The title was unveiled later that year as Doom 3. The design of the title would be led by Willits. Using the new id Tech 4 engine, numerous technical improvements were made over the classic series, allowing greater realism and interactivity. The game used voice acting and featured a greater focus on narrative than earlier titles. A demo of the game was shown at E3 2002 and was subsequently leaked online, well ahead of the 2004 release date. At the time, it was the first Doom title in seven years, and helped renew interest in the franchise. An expansion, Doom 3: Resurrection of Evil was released in 2005. Unlike the base game, the expansion was developed by Nerve Software. A 2012 "BFG Edition" featured both previous releases along with a new expansion entitled The Lost Mission.

Doom 4 entered development in the mid 2000s alongside Rage, with the new Doom title initially planned as a rework of Doom II. Hints were present in 2007 at QuakeCon, and the game was formally announced in 2008. Response to preview material was negative, with fans nicknaming the project "Call of Doom", after a perceived similarity to the Call of Duty franchise. Bethesda marketing vice president Pete Hines stated in retrospect that "it wasn't Doom enough". After Rage was not as successful as hoped, publisher ZeniMax requested a reboot of Doom 4 and moved the Rage staff over to the new project. This version was built using Rages code base and suffered from disputes among staff, particularly among managers of the two projects. The game was cancelled in 2013. John Carmack, one of the few remaining veterans from the development of the classic series still present at id, left the studio that November.

The period saw the release of several spinoffs for mobile platforms. These included Doom RPG (2005), Doom II RPG (2009), and Doom Resurrection (2009). Additionally, the 2010 Xbox Live Arcade re-release of Doom II featured a new expansion entitled No Rest for the Living, which was developed by Nerve Software. This was structured in a similar manner to classic Doom chapters, with eight primary levels and one secret level. This release was packaged with the BFG Edition of Doom 3 in 2012.

Revival series (2013–present) 

After the 2013 scrapping of the Doom 4 project, Willits stated that the next game in the Doom series was still the team's focus. Hugo Martin was hired as creative director on the project in 2013. The project was announced as Doom in 2014, and was released to generally positive reception in 2016. A glory kill mechanic and additional platforming manoeuvres were among the main gameplay additions. The game's multiplayer mode received three small downloadable content releases over the course of the first year, and all three were then released for free with the 6.66 update on July 19, 2017.

The 2016 series was not originally described as a continuation or origin story of earlier games, however plot details in the sequel Doom Eternal and commentary from Martin would later describe it as a continuation of the classic series. The 2020 re-release of Doom 64 included an expansion entitled The Lost Levels, intended "to connect 'old' Doom to 'new' Doom".

A VR spinoff entitled  Doom VFR was released in 2017 to generally positive reception, with reviewers discussing the movement controls in particular- which were well made albeit hidden behind menus. The game features a single-player campaign, and reused enemies and other assets from the 2016 game. The game would be the last Doom title under Willits' leadership, ahead of his departure in 2019. 2018 marked the 25th anniversary of the franchise, and saw the Doom Slayer included as a playable character in id Software's Quake Champions. That year, John Romero announced Sigil, an unofficial "fifth episode" of the original 1993 game. The episode was released for free via Romero's website in 2019, with a paid version available that included a soundtrack by guitarist Buckethead. While Sigil was developed independently, Bethesda added the episode to the console ports of Doom as a free patch in October, alongside the two chapters of Final Doom.

The next main entry in the franchise, Doom Eternal, was directed by Hugo Martin and released in 2020. The title sold very well, generating $450 million in revenue over the first year; double the launch revenue of the previous title. Some commentators cited the timing of the release, which coincided with a wave of interest in gaming worldwide amid restrictions on social gathering during the coronavirus pandemic. The game was made in id Tech 7, which afforded numerous technical improvements over the id Tech 6 engine used by its predecessor. An expansion of the game, The Ancient Gods, was released in two parts, one in October 2020 and the other in March 2021.

In March 2022, John Romero released a new Doom II level entitled One Humanity. The proceeds from the level were donated as humanitarian aid for Ukraine amid the Russian invasion. The level was the first for Doom II designed by Romero since 1994, and raised 25,000 euros by March 7.

Future 
In March 2021, Hugo Martin discussed some directions future Doom titles could take, discussing time travel or a game set in the time span between Doom 64 and Doom (2016), when the Doom Slayer "first came to that place with the Sentinels, almost like a more medieval setting". Romero confirmed in August 2021 that a second Sigil expansion using the Doom II engine was in development.

A spin-off for mobile, Mighty Doom, was released in March 2023.

Games

Main series

Spin-offs

Other media

Novels

A set of four novels based on Doom were written by Dafydd ab Hugh and Brad Linaweaver, and were published between June 1995 and January 1996 by Pocket Books. The books, listed in order, are titled Knee Deep in the Dead, Hell on Earth, Infernal Sky and Endgame. The unnamed Marine is called "Flynn Taggart" or "Fly" in the novels. The first two books feature recognizable locations and situations from the first two games.

In 2005, a film novelization was released by Pocket Star Books. It was adapted by John Shirley.

In 2008, a new series of Doom novels by Matthew J. Costello, an author who had worked on the story and scripts for Doom 3 and Resurrection of Evil, were published. The series of books aim to novelize the story of Doom 3, with the first installment, Doom 3: Worlds on Fire, published on February 26, 2008. The second book in the series, Doom 3: Maelstrom, was released in March 2009.

Comic book
A one-shot comic book written by Steve Behling and Michael Stewart with art by Tom Grindberg was released in May 1996 by Marvel Comics as a giveaway for a video game convention.

Tabletop games
In 2004, a board game designed by Kevin Wilson and published by Fantasy Flight Games titled Doom: The Boardgame was released.

In 2020, Critical Role published a fifth edition Dungeons & Dragons module entitled Doom Eternal: Assault on Amaros Station. The game was written by Christopher Lockey and Matthew Mercer, and received a digital release via the Critical Role store on December 16, 2020.

Films

Doom (2005)

In 2005, Universal Pictures released the first live-action film adaptation, titled Doom, which starred Karl Urban and Dwayne Johnson.

Doom: Annihilation (2019)

In 2019, Universal released a second live-action film adaptation direct-to-video, titled Doom: Annihilation starring Amy Manson.

Reception

In 1996, Next Generation ranked the series as the 19th top game of all time, for how "despite the hundreds of copycat titles, no one has ever been able to equal id's original, pulsing classic." In 1999, Next Generation listed the Doom series as number 25 on their "Top 50 Games of All Time," commenting that, "despite the graphic advances since Doom was released, the pixilated Barons of Hell and Cyber Demons still rank as some of the scariest things that can grace your screen."

The series' unnamed protagonist, a marine, has had a mostly positive reception. In 2009, GameDaily included "the Marine" on its list of "ten game heroes who fail at the simple stuff" for his inability to look up and down in the original series. UGO Networks ranked him fourth on its 2012 list of best silent protagonists in video games, noting his courage to continue in silence even when he faces Hell's army. In 2013, Complex ranked Doomguy at number 16 on its list of the greatest soldiers in video games for being "the original video game space marine" and "one of the classic silent protagonists." Both CraveOnline and VGRC ranked him the fifth most "badass" male character in the video game's history.

Sales 
The original Doom sold 3.5 million physical copies and 1.15 million shareware copies from its 1993 release up through 1999. Doom II sold 1.55 million copies of all types in the United States during the same period, with about a quarter of that number also sold in Europe, a total of some 5-6 million sales for the original duology. Doom 3 sold 3.5 million copies along with many copies of the expansion pack Resurrection of Evil from its 2004 release up through 2007, making it the most successful game in the series at that point. The sales of Doom 64 were not disclosed.

The 2016 reboot sold over 2 million copies on the PC alone from its May 2016 release up to July 2017.

References

 
ZeniMax Media franchises
Microsoft franchises
Video game franchises introduced in 1993
First-person shooters by series
Science fantasy video games
Video game franchises
Video games about demons
Video games adapted into comics
Video games adapted into films
Video games adapted into novels
Video games set in hell
Video games set on Mars
Undead in popular culture
Horror video games
Military science fiction video games
Military science fiction